Marco Schiavino (born 25 April 1993) is an Italian footballer who plays for Serie D club Team Altamura.

Biography
Born in Rome, capital of Italy, Schiavino started his career at Cisco Roma. In October 2010 he was signed by French club Valenciennes. Schiavino was a player of Crotone in the reserve league in 2011–12 season. On 12 July 2012 Schiavino was farmed to Como in co-ownership deal. Schiavino made his debut in pre-season friendlies. On 19 August he made his professional debut in Lega Pro cup. Schiavino also played the second cup match as well as the opening match of 2012–13 Lega Pro Prima Divisione. Schiavino made 18 starts in the third division that season. On 21 June 2013 Crotone reacquired Schiavino's registration rights after making a higher tender bid to Lega Serie B office. Schiavino also received call-up to Lega Pro under-21 representative team, against Russia and Oman.

In July 2013 Schiavino was signed by Ascoli. He was a player of reserve against the first team in the pre-season. On 5 August he also substituted Ivan Reali in the first round of Italian cup.

On 6 August 2018, he signed a one-year contract with Serie C club Paganese. He re-signed with Paganese for the 2019–20 season and subsequently until June 2022.

References

External links
 AIC profile (data by football.it) 
 

Italian footballers
Atletico Roma F.C. players
Valenciennes FC players
F.C. Crotone players
Como 1907 players
Ascoli Calcio 1898 F.C. players
Paganese Calcio 1926 players
Association football defenders
Serie C players
Serie D players
Italian expatriate footballers
Italian expatriate sportspeople in France
Expatriate footballers in France
Footballers from Rome
1993 births
Living people